Alsåker is a village in the municipality of Ullensvang, in Vestland county, Norway. The village lies on the Folgefonn Peninsula, along the shore of the Hardangerfjorden.

References

Villages in Vestland
Ullensvang